David Cecil MacAlister Tomlinson (7 May 1917 – 24 June 2000) was an English stage, film, and television actor and comedian. Having been described as both a leading man and a character actor, he is primarily remembered for his roles as authority figure George Banks in Mary Poppins, fraudulent magician Professor Emelius Browne in Bedknobs and Broomsticks, and as hapless antagonist Peter Thorndyke in The Love Bug. Tomlinson was posthumously inducted as a Disney Legend in 2002.

Early life
David Cecil McAlister Tomlinson was born in Henley-on-Thames, Oxfordshire, on 7 May 1917, the son of Florence Elizabeth Tomlinson (née Sinclair-Thomson) (1890–1986) and a well-respected London solicitor father, Clarence Samuel Tomlinson (1883–1978). He attended Tonbridge School and left to join the Grenadier Guards for 16 months. His father then secured him a job as a clerk at Shell Mex House.

His stage career grew from amateur stage productions to his 1940 film debut in Quiet Wedding. His career was interrupted when he entered Second World War service as a Flight Lieutenant in the RAF. During the war, he learned to fly in Canada and was assigned as a flying instructor in the UK, while also appearing in three more films. He continued flying after the war. On one occasion, a Tiger Moth plane he was piloting crashed into woodland near his back garden after he lost consciousness while performing aerobatics.

Film career
David Tomlinson played the role of George Banks, head of the Banks family, in the Disney film Mary Poppins (1964). Mary Poppins brought Tomlinson continued work with Disney, appearing in The Love Bug (1968) and Bedknobs and Broomsticks (1971). Throughout the rest of Tomlinson's film career, he never steered far from comedies. His final acting appearance was in The Fiendish Plot of Dr. Fu Manchu (1980), which was also the final film of Peter Sellers. Tomlinson retired from acting at age 63 to spend more time with his family. However, in 1992, at the age of 75, he appeared on the Wogan talk show along with Tommy Cockles.

Personal life and death
Tomlinson was first married to Mary Lindsay Hiddingh, daughter of L. Seton Lindsay, the vice president of the New York Life Insurance Company. She had been widowed in 1941 when her husband, Major A. G. Hiddingh, was killed in action, leaving her to care for their two young sons. Tomlinson married Mary in New York in September 1943, but on 2 December 1943, she killed herself and her two sons in a murder–suicide by jumping from a hotel in New York City, after learning that she could not take her two sons with her to join Tomlinson in England until WWII ended.

Tomlinson's second wife was actress Audrey Freeman (born 12 November 1931), whom he married on 17 May 1953, and the couple remained together for 47 years until his death. They had four sons: David Jr., William, Henry, and James.

He was 83 years old. He was interred at his estate grounds in Mursley, Buckinghamshire. Tomlinson had joked that he wanted "actor of genius, irresistible to women" as an epitaph.

Filmography

Film

Television

See also
The Life I Lead, a 2019 one-man comedy play by James Kettle which explores Tomlinson's life, starring Miles Jupp.

References

Further reading
Luckier Than Most, Tomlinson's autobiography, published 1990.
Nathan Morley, Disney's British Gentleman: The Life and Career of David Tomlinson (History Press), 2021.

External links

Mary Poppins Star Dies – BBC News obituary from 2000
David Tomlinson at the Disney Legends website
Actor David Tomlinson's life plagued by tragedy and misfortune despite finding fame, a 2021 Daily Express article by Nathan Morley describing Tomlinson's personal story, plagued by misfortune.

1917 births
2000 deaths
20th-century English male actors
English male film actors
English male stage actors
English male television actors
Grenadier Guards soldiers
Male actors from Kent
Male actors from Oxfordshire
People from Henley-on-Thames
People educated at Tonbridge School
Royal Air Force pilots of World War II
Royal Air Force officers
20th-century British Army personnel
Disney people
English male comedians